Peter Sukovský (born 16 February 1975 in Vranov nad Topľou) is a Slovak football player who currently plays for FK Spartak Brekov.

External links 

 Profile at playerhistory.com 

1975 births
Living people
People from Vranov nad Topľou
Sportspeople from the Prešov Region
Slovak footballers
Slovak expatriate footballers
FC VSS Košice players
FC Karpaty Lviv players
Ukrainian Premier League players
Expatriate footballers in Ukraine

Association football defenders